The Gay Men's Chorus of Los Angeles (GMCLA) is an amateur choral group composed of gay men from the Los Angeles area. Established in 1979, GMCLA has grown in size, gained professional artistic and administrative staff, toured nationally and internationally, and released 16 CDs. GMCLA has appeared with numerous stage, film, and television celebrities including Billy Porter, Lily Tomlin, Angela Lansbury, Bea Arthur, Malcolm Gets, Doris Roberts, Jerry Herman, Melissa Manchester, Mary McDonnell, Levi Kreis, Joanna Gleason, Alex Newell, Amber Riley, Charles Pierce, Miss Coco Peru, Valarie Pettiford, Jane Lanier, Randi Driscoll, Margaret Cho, Michael Jeter, Stephen Schwartz, Liz Callaway, Lance Bass, Jennifer Holliday, Tierney Sutton, and LeAnn Rimes. The Chorus has appeared on several television broadcasts including the 85th Academy Awards, Access Hollywood, Will & Grace, $#*! My Dad Says, The Ren & Stimpy Show, Mad TV, and a six-episode arc on Six Feet Under.

Community involvement and history 

The chorus first formed on July 12, 1979, at Plummer Park Community Center, Los Angeles as a volunteer effort of 99 gay men. The first major public event the GMCLA participated in was the March on Washington D.C. The GMCLA also participated in the first-ever national LGBTQ concert at the Washington Memorial.

The GMCLA continued to grow throughout the late 1970s and early 1980s. During the AIDS crisis, the chorus suffered the loss of its musical director, Jerry Carlson, to HIV/AIDS as well as over 20 other members by 1988. Ultimately, over 150 members were lost to the AIDS pandemic leaving only eight original members of the chorus as members, who are known as the 'First Nighters'.

The GMCLA was under the direction of Christopher Verdugo from 2011 until September 9, 2016, when Verdugo decided to step down as director in search of new opportunities. Verdugo was a member of the choir for ten years, beginning as a choral member and later transitioning to his executive role in 2011. Under his leadership the chorus grew to 250 members. During his time with GMCLA, Verdugo drew inspiration from the It Gets Better Project to launch a national tour partnered with Speak Theater Arts. The main goal of the "It Gets Better" tour was to tackle a variety of issues that affect LGBT folks throughout their lives through music and storytelling. The cast of the shows consists of eight members of the GMCLA who tour around the country. The cast partners up with local schools and community members to deliver relatable content to youth at risk of bullying and their potential allies. The final show aims to shed light on the lives of LGBT people through musical performance.

Dr Joe Nadeau was named artistic director in the fall of 2013 and has worked alongside Kevin Bolling (Director of Philanthropy), Gavin Thrasher (Assistant Conductor), Brianne Cohen (Events and Tour Manager), Taylor Hartley (Marketing Operations Manager), and James Geiger (Online Development - Photographer). In January 2017, Jonathan Weedman was named the new Executive Director of GMCLA. Jonathan is an ardent supporter of the arts and of LGBT equal rights advocacy, and former esteemed long-time Wells Fargo Foundation Senior Vice President.

At the end of December 2018, Dr. Joe Nadeau resigned to return to Kansas City with his husband Eric and has been succeeded by Gavin Thrasher, now Interim Artistic Director.

GMCLA also started the Alive Music Project (AMP) in 2007, which has reached over 60,000 teenage students in middle and high schools in Los Angeles. The school's Gay-Straight Alliances form partnerships with GMCLA to help improve the experience of LGBT youth in American schools. The members of GMCLA utilize their own stories and experiences to deliver a message of acceptance. The emphasis is placed on the impact singing with members of their own community has had in the creation of a safe space. The students and the members of the GMCLA come together at an assembly to participate in musical performances and a question and answer period.

GMCLA is supported by many corporate and government partners. Notably, Foresters Financial helped launch GMCLA's Voice Awards. This annual award show is running on its 6th consecutive year, and it aims to honor those who use their platforms for social change and advancement towards equality. In 2016, the award show raised funds in support of GCMLA's outreach programs: the Alive Music Project and the It Gets Better Tour. Hosted by Ross Mathews, a television host from the popular show Hollywood Today Live, and Pauley Perrette, the actress most commonly known for her role as Abby Sciuto in NCIS, the show was held on April 23 at the Dolby Ballroom Hollywood and had over 600 attendees.

Notable performances
GMCLA became the first gay chorus to tour central Europe in 1991. That historic tour was featured in a documentary entitled "Out Loud" and was broadcast on the PBS television network.

GMCLA became the first gay men's chorus ever to perform for a sitting President of the United States, Bill Clinton in 1997. In September 2011, GMCLA sang for President Barack Obama at a fundraiser in West Hollywood, California.

GMCLA became the first openly gay performers ever to be broadcast nationally over Russian television during their 1999 concert tour (sold-out concert in Tchaikovsky Hall, Moscow).

In 2006, GMCLA was the first openly gay chorus to tour South America (Argentina, Brazil, Uruguay, and Chile), performing at some of the most revered theatres and concert venues. The repertoire included North American and European classical and popular music from Bacharach to Verdi, as well as new works commissioned for the tour by Daniel Catán, Rosephanye Powell, and Daniel Alfonso. New music for the Tour was funded by the National Endowment for the Arts, the James Irvine Foundation, and Los Angeles County Arts Commission. In each of the four countries, the Chorus raised money for LGBT and HIV organizations, as well as helped to start the first gay chorus in South America, in Rio de Janeiro.

Each year the Chorus presents three mainstage concerts in such venues as the Saban Theatre in Beverly Hills, California, Walt Disney Concert Hall in downtown Los Angeles, California, and the historic Alex Theatre in Glendale, California; GMCLA performed over 100 times on the Alex stage since 1994, more than any other musical group in the theater's history.

GMCLA was featured in the song "Shia LaBeouf" by Rob Cantor.

In 2010 GMCLA recorded a music video of Cyndi Lauper's "True Colors" as part of the It Gets Better campaign in support of gay and lesbian teens. Singers LeAnn Rimes and Sheryl Lee Ralph joined the Chorus in December 2010 for their "Comfort and Joy" concerts, which also addressed bullying and teen suicide.

In 2013 GMCLA performed in the 85th Academy Awards, now the Oscars, in the opening musical sequence "We Saw Your Boobs" with host Seth MacFarlane. The following year they were featured at the Hollywood Bowl in "The Simpsons Take The Bowl" with Conan O'Brien, Beverly D'Angelo, and the cast and creators of The Simpsons, celebrating the show's 25th Anniversary.

References

External links
Official website
Facebook

Musical groups established in 1979
Choirs in California
Gay men's choruses
Musical groups from Los Angeles
1979 establishments in California
Gay culture in California